Joo Chiat Road is one of a road in Katong and a residential conservation area located in the east coast of Singapore. It has won several architectural and heritage awards including the United Nations' UNESCO Asia-Pacific Awards for Cultural Heritage Conservation at 125 Joo Chiat Road. It has overtaken Holland Village in terms of most diverse eateries. Currently, Joo Chiat has become one of the hippiest and coolest towns in Singapore, with both rich and young professionals flocking to its numerous Michelin awarded restaurants. Joo Chiat Road carries a rich historical Peranakan architecture and is infused with rich Peranakan culture, as it has the most historical Peranakan buildings in the Katong district. Joo Chiat was named after a businessman by the name of Chew Joo Chiat after he donated the land to the Municipality of Singapore.

History
Before 1917, Joo Chiat Road was known as the Confederate Estate Road. At that time, most of the land in the area belonged to the Little family. The road name changed after Chew Joo Chiat, a famous prominent ethnic Chinese businessman of Peranakan descent who became the owner of most of the land in the area around Joo Chiat Road. Chew bought land from the Alsagoff family as well as the Little family to plant spices, such as nutmeg, gambier and pepper which were in great demand by Europeans.  

In 1903, Chew added more land to his plantation by purchasing more than an acre of land for $35,000/- from Henry William Crane. Later, he turned all his land into coconut plantations when copra became a cash crop. His foresight and business acumen made him a wealthy land owner. In 1913, he bought at auction 5 freehold building allotments fronting the Confederate Estate Road to further increase his land holding. In early 1917 Joo Chiat Road was still a cart track going through Chew's plantation, and as such it was a private road maintained by him. Transportation of local produce was by bullock carts. Joo Chiat area was then under the jurisdiction of the Rural Board.  

When the Municipal Limit extended into Joo Chiat Road, the Municipality wanted to construct a road for motor vehicles from Geylang Serai to the beach and offered to buy the stretch of Chew's land (the Confederate Estate Road) to construct a road for motor vehicles. Chew saw the benefit of a transport infrastructure going through his land, and bequeathed the road to the authority without compensation. For his generosity, the road was named after him: Joo Chiat Road. As more people moved into area around Joo Chiat Road, especially along East Coast Road, there was a big demand for housing. Chew divided his land into building lots and sold them to developers to build houses. Subsequent establishment of some of Singapore’s earliest season houses and holiday bungalows resulted in Joo Chiat becoming a wealthy and upper middle class suburb with a relaxing and scenic locale.  

Today, Joo Chiat Road is best known for its colourful rows of traditional Peranakan shophouses, dating back to the 1920s and 1930s, that line the narrow street. Joo Chiat’s development began with attendant amenities and an electric tramway was built between the Joo Chiat-Changi Market and Tanjong Pagar. 

Chew Joo Chiat was known as King of Katong after his death on 5 February 1926. Madam Chew Quee Neo, who was the daughter of Chew Joo Chiat donated a piece of land to built a Theravada Buddhist temple known as "Mangala Vihara" in 1959 which is cater for the Peranakan Buddhist community.

Post-war to 1966 
Joo Chiat was never a standalone location, it was always part of an area or a road in Katong area and thus many buildings such Katong Presbyterian Church was name after Katong since 1957. After world war 2, it became an active retail and entertainment hub in the 1950s and 1960s, with popular supermarket Tay Buan Guan, Red House Katong Bakery and food specialties such as Katong Laksa. 
Changi Market (now Joo Chiat Complex) at Joo Chiat Road became an important trading centre for Malays from Malaysia, Brunei and Indonesia. They traded in food, flowers and spices, which remain a major part of the area's economy today. The development of Geylang Serai in the 60s also prompted the government to build mosques and theatres in Joo Chiat. There were other amenities for the community living there including a police station, schools and health centre.

1967- 1975
As Singapore’s population grew and people started to move out from the city centre, Joo Chiat’s community increased. 4 more schools were built along with a community centre. Joo Chiat continued to be the entertainment hub with Galaxy theatre and the addition of 2 more shopping centres.

1976 – 1984
East Coast reclamation started in 1966 and lasted for two decades until 1985. Its reclamation changed the physical landscape of the area with the modification of the coastline, landscape and even the removal of Katong jetty. Coupled with new high rise housing estate in East Coast, Joo Chiat slowly lost its distinct identity amid this de-territorialisation process. 

The late 70s and early 80s also saw more road changes where adjacent streets were linked up to ease commute. Taj Cinema, adjacent to the markets, was also renamed by Shaw to Singapura theatre. However, Singapura theatre lost its attractiveness with the rise of cinematography and eventually shut down in 1985.

1985 - 1995
As the Kampongs in Geylang made way for HDBs, a museum to showcase the life of Malays was proposed in the 70s. This museum, Geylang Serai Malay Village, was completed in 1989 and located at the start of Joo Chiat Road. The period also saw many more buildings for retail purposes such as Galaxy Complex, Katong Mall, Roxy Square and Paramount Shopping Centre.

1996 - 2007
Brothels in central region were removed by the government from 1959 onwards and these brothels have shifted to Geylang. The spread of sex industry from Geylang to the surrounding area created a profound effect on the type of business in Joo Chiat Rd in the 90s and early 2000s. The residents complained to the member of parliament and the police relentlessly raided all the hotels and KTVS and instituted neighborhood watch and whistle blowing systems with countless CCTV along the roads to monitor and arrest any future offenders. As a result, Joo Chiat Rd after 2008 rose up to become one of the safest road in Singapore, completely free of vice activities, and it has transformed to one of the hippiest and coolest towns in Singapore, with both rich and young professionals flocking to its savory cafes and restaurants. After 2008, it later became a popular tourist attraction and many tour groups from all over the world travel there to have their memorable photo shoot with the Peranakan conserved houses. It carries a rich historical Peranakan colonial architecture and is infused with rich Peranakan culture, as it has the most historical Peranakan buildings in the Katong district.

Present
In 2011, the vicinity surrounding Joo Chiat Road was declared Singapore's first Heritage Town. It is chosen, in part, because of strong efforts to promote its Peranakan culture. Currently, Joo Chiat has become one of the hippiest and coolest towns in Singapore, with both rich and young professionals flocking to its savory cafes and restaurants. Joo Chiat is also one of the Singapore food streets with UNESCO Status.

In 2014, Lucky Shophouse, formerly Lucky Bookstore, located at 125 Joo Chiat Road was awarded the Jury Commendation for Innovation at the 2014 UNESCO Asia Pacific Heritage Awards

Politics
The Joo Chiat Single Member Constituency is a ward in the Singapore Parliament. The Member of Parliament for Joo Chiat is Charles Chong after 2011 general elections when the then incumbent Chan Soo Sen retired from politics. However, Joo Chiat ward is now not consisting of Joo Chiat area but of Siglap. For the General Election 2015, Joo Chiat constituency ceased to exist and it has been absorbed by Marine Parade GRC.

Food
There are famous eateries which contribute to Joo Chiat’s popularity as a dining spot. Since 2014, Joo Chiat begins to experience a significant shift in culture and immigration. Today, western cafe and high-class dinning are sprouting over Joo Chiat Road because a lot of Caucasians shifted in after discovering Joo Chiat has better historical culture than Holland Village, and it is very close to the seaside, and would fit in to their lifestyle preference. Thus, a lot of Chinese, Malaysians, and Vietnamese restaurants changed to western restaurants or cafe. Joo Chiat now becomes a multicultural food enclave, not just a Peranakan enclave. The restaurants and various eateries along the street are of varied cuisines from all over the world.

See also
 Katong

References

 National Heritage Board (2002), Singapore's 100 Historic Places, Archipelago Press,

External links
 Makansutra's Guide to Joo Chiat
 Philip Chew's Chew Joo Chiat Blog
 Joo Chiat PA Website
 Joo Chiat Community Website
 Joo Chiat PA Sport Club

Places in Singapore
Protected areas of Singapore
Geylang
Marine Parade
Hokkien place names